Hank Pellissier is a writer, editor, speaker, producer, and nonprofit director - he has been involved with transhumanist, atheist, educational, and humanitarian topics.

Career
In the 1980s and 1990s, Pellissier used the moniker "Hank Hyena" as a San Francisco performance artist, slam poet, and metro journalist. John Strausbaugh, in a highly critical review of the anthology The Outlaw Bible of American Poetry for New York Press in 2015, described Hank Hyena as one of the "better representatives of the 90s shout-it-out school of poetry". As Hank Hyena, Pellissier contributed to Salon.com, SFGate.com, and GettingIt.com, performed at the Cleveland Performance Art Festival, and produced a "subversive" fashion show as part of a Mozart festival in San Francisco in 1991. Under his own name, Pellissier co-produced an Atheist Film Festival in San Francisco and contributed to The New York Times column "Local Intelligence."

Pellissier has published transhumanist/futurist essays in HplusMagazine, and, in the early 2010s, he wrote articles for the Institute for Ethics and Emerging Technologies (IEET) where he was appointed managing director in 2012. His essay “Eight Ways In-Vitro Meat Will Change Our Lives” was re-published in Best of H+ Magazine. He has also  self-published the books Invent Utopia Now: Transhumanist Suggestions for the Pre-Singularity Era, Why is the IQ of Ashkenazi Jews so High?, and Brighter Brains - 225 Ways to Elevate or Injure IQ.

After leaving IEET, he started the websites Transhumanity.net and the nonprofit Brighter Brains Institute and produced eight "Transhuman visions" conferences in the SF Bay Area. The Brighter Brains Institute built the “world’s first atheist orphanage” in Uganda in 2015 and it sent Soylent to support Mangyan villagers of the Philippines. Pellissier stated that he finds "it appalling that people want to go to Mars but they neglect the fact that there are millions of people in the world who are starving.”  In 2020, his nonprofit changed its name to Humanist Global Charity, and in the same year, Pellissier started a think tank called Egalitarian Planet dedicated to global egalitarianism.

See also 
 Atheist Film Festival

References

American non-fiction writers
American columnists
Year of birth missing
American transhumanists